The temporal fossa is a fossa (shallow depression) on the side of the skull bounded by the temporal lines and terminating below the level of the zygomatic arch.

Boundaries
 Medial:   frontal bone, parietal bone, temporal bone, and sphenoid bone.
 Lateral:  Temporal fascia
 Anterior: Posterior surface of the frontal process of the zygomatic bone and the posterior surface of the zygomatic process of the frontal bone.
 Superior: Pair of temporal lines (superior and inferior temporal lines) that arch across the skull from the zygomatic process of the frontal bone to the supramastoid crest of the temporal bone
 Inferior: Zygomatic arch laterally and by the infratemporal crest of the greater wing of the sphenoid medially.

Temporal & Infratemporal Fossa
 Osteology
 Temporal fossa, boundaries & contents
 Infratemporal fossa, boundaries & contents
 Muscles of mastication
 Maxillary artery 
 Pterygoid venous plexus
 Mandibular nerve
 Temporomandibular Joint

Contents
 Temporalis muscle
 Deep temporal arteries
Deep temporal nerves
 Superficial temporal artery (from external carotid)
 Zygomaticotemporal nerve

Clinical significance
The pterion is located in the temporal fossa, Clinically the pterion is an important area because it overlies the anterior division of the middle meningeal artery and vein. Trauma in this region can lead to an extradural haematoma, which can result in herniation of brain tissue and ischemia.

Additional images

External links

Skull